In organic chemistry, ozonolysis is an organic reaction where the unsaturated bonds of alkenes, alkynes, or azo compounds are cleaved with ozone. Alkenes and alkynes form organic compounds in which the multiple carbon–carbon bond has been replaced by a carbonyl group while azo compounds form nitrosamines. The outcome of the reaction depends on the type of multiple bond being oxidized and the work-up conditions.

Ozonolysis of alkenes
Alkenes can be oxidized with ozone to form alcohols, aldehydes or ketones, or carboxylic acids.  In a typical procedure, ozone is bubbled through a solution of the alkene in methanol at −78 °C until the solution takes on a characteristic blue color, which is due to unreacted ozone.  This indicates complete consumption of the alkene. Alternatively, various other chemicals can be used as indicators of this endpoint by detecting the presence of ozone. If ozonolysis is performed by bubbling a stream of ozone-enriched oxygen through the reaction mixture, the gas that bubbles out can be directed through a potassium iodide solution. When the solution has stopped absorbing ozone, the ozone in the bubbles oxidizes the iodide to iodine, which can easily be observed by its violet color. For closer control of the reaction itself, an indicator such as Sudan Red III can be added to the reaction mixture. Ozone reacts with this indicator more slowly than with the intended ozonolysis target. The ozonolysis of the indicator, which causes a noticeable color change, only occurs once the desired target has been consumed. If the substrate has two alkenes that react with ozone at different rates, one can choose an indicator whose own oxidation rate is intermediate between them, and therefore stop the reaction when only the most susceptible alkene in the substrate has reacted. Otherwise, the presence of unreacted ozone in solution (seeing its blue color) or in the bubbles (via iodide detection) only indicates when all alkenes have reacted.

After completing the addition, a reagent is then added to convert the intermediate ozonide to a carbonyl derivative. Reductive work-up conditions are far more commonly used than oxidative conditions.  The use of triphenylphosphine, thiourea, zinc dust, or dimethyl sulfide produces aldehydes or ketones while the use of sodium borohydride produces alcohols. The use of hydrogen peroxide produces carboxylic acids.  Recently, the use of amine N-oxides has been reported to produce aldehydes directly. Other functional groups, such as benzyl ethers, can also be oxidized by ozone.  It has been proposed that small amounts of acid may be generated during the reaction from oxidation of the solvent, so pyridine is sometimes used to buffer the reaction. Dichloromethane is often used as a 1:1 cosolvent to facilitate timely cleavage of the ozonide. Azelaic acid and pelargonic acids are produced from ozonolysis of oleic acid on an industrial scale.

An example is the ozonolysis of eugenol converting the terminal alkene to an aldehyde:

By controlling the reaction/workup conditions, unsymmetrical products can be generated from symmetrical alkenes: 
 Using TsOH; sodium bicarbonate (NaHCO3); dimethyl sulfide (DMS) gives an aldehyde and a dimethyl acetal
 Using acetic anhydride (Ac2O), triethylamine (Et3N) gives a methyl ester and an aldehyde 
 Using TsOH; Ac2O, Et3N, gives a methyl ester and a dimethyl acetal.

Reaction mechanism

In the generally accepted mechanism proposed by Rudolf Criegee in 1953, the alkene and ozone form an intermediate molozonide in a 1,3-dipolar cycloaddition.  Next, the molozonide reverts to its corresponding carbonyl oxide (also called the Criegee intermediate or Criegee zwitterion) and aldehyde or ketone in a retro-1,3-dipolar cycloaddition.  The oxide and aldehyde or ketone react again in a 1,3-dipolar cycloaddition or produce a relatively stable ozonide intermediate (a trioxolane).

Evidence for this mechanism is found in isotopic labeling.  When 17O-labelled benzaldehyde reacts with carbonyl oxides, the label ends up exclusively in the ether linkage of the ozonide.  There is still dispute over whether the molozonide collapses via a concerted or radical process; this may also exhibit a substrate dependence.

History
Christian Friedrich Schönbein, who discovered ozone in 1840, also did the first ozonolysis: in 1845, he reported that ethylene reacts with ozone – after the reaction, neither the smell of ozone nor the smell of ethylene was perceivable.  The ozonolysis of alkenes is sometimes referred to as "Harries ozonolysis", because some attribute this reaction to Carl Dietrich Harries. Before the advent of modern spectroscopic techniques, the ozonolysis was an important method for determining the structure of organic molecules. Chemists would ozonize an unknown alkene to yield smaller and more readily identifiable fragments.

Ozonolysis of alkynes
Ozonolysis of alkynes generally gives an acid anhydride or diketone product, not complete fragmentation as for alkenes. A reducing agent is not needed for these reactions. The exact mechanism is not completely known. If the reaction is performed in the presence of water, the anhydride hydrolyzes to give two carboxylic acids.

Ozonolysis of other substrates
Ozonolysis of oleic acid is an important route to azelaic acid. The coproduct is nonanoic acid:
\underset{oleic\ acid}{H17C8CH=CHC7H14CO2H}{} + 4O3 ->  \underset{azelaic\ acid}{HO2CC7H14CO2H}{} + \underset{nonanoic\ acid}{H17C8CO2H}

Ozonolysis of elastomers

The method was used to confirm the structural repeat unit in natural rubber as isoprene. It is also a serious problem, known as ozone cracking where traces of the gas in an atmosphere cause degradation in elastomers, such as natural rubber, polybutadiene, styrene-butadiene and nitrile rubber. Ozonolysis creates surface ketone groups which can cause further gradual degradation via Norrish reactions if the polymer is exposed to light. 

Ozone cracking is a form of stress corrosion cracking where active chemical species attack products of a susceptible material. The rubber product must be under tension for crack growth to occur. Ozone cracking was once commonly seen in the sidewalls of tires, where it could expand to cause a dangerous blowout, but is now rare owing to the use of modern antiozonants. Other means of prevention include replacing susceptible rubbers with resistant elastomers such as polychloroprene, EPDM or Viton.

See also
Polymer degradation
Lemieux–Johnson oxidation – an alternative system using periodate and osmium tetroxide
Trametes hirsuta, a biotechnological alternative to ozonolysis.

References 

Organic oxidation reactions
Cycloadditions